Sultan Makhdoom Ashraf Jahangir Semnani ((1285–1386)  was an Iranian Sufi saint from Semnan, Iran. He was the founder of the Ashrafi Sufi order. He is India's third most influential Sufi Saint after Khwaja Moinuddin Chishti of Ajmer and Nizamuddin Auliya of Delhi.

His father Sultan Ibrahim Noorbaksh was the local ruler of Semnan. Semnani was claimed to be the descendant of the Islamic prophet, Muhammad, through his grandson Husayn ibn Ali. His mother Bibi Khadija was said to be a descendant of the Turkic Sufi saint Ahmad Yasawi.

Lineage 
Semnani was said to be a descendant of Muhammad through his daughter Fatimah from the lineage of her son, Husayn ibn Ali.

Spiritual Lineage 
Semnani spiritual lineage of Chishti Order
Muhammad
Fatima bint Muhammad and Ali ibn Abi Talib
Hasan al-Basri
Abdul Waahid Bin Zaid
Fudhail Bin Iyadh
Ibrahim Bin Adham
Huzaifah Al-Mar'ashi Basra
Abu Hubayra al-Basri
Khwaja Mumshad Uluw Al Dīnawarī Dinawar
Abu Ishaq Shamī ( Chishti Name start)
Abu Aḥmad Abdal Chishti
Abu Muḥammad Chishti
Abu Yusuf Bin Saamaan
Maudood Chishti
Shareef Zandani
Usman Harooni
Muinuddin Chishti
Qutbuddin Bakhtiar Kaki 
Fariduddin Ganjshakar
Nizamuddin Auliya
Akhi Siraj
Alaul Haq Pandavi
Ashraf Jahangir Semnani

Early life 
After his father's death, Semnani then aged 17, became the ruler of Semnan. He was said to be inclined towards mysticism. He enjoyed the company of Ruknuddin Ala ul Daula Semnani.

At the age of 23, Semnani abdicated his throne in favor of his brother Sultan Sayyid Muhammad. Thereafter, Semnani migrated to Bengal in order to meet Alaul Haq Pandavi.

Travels 

After performing the obligatory pilgrimage to the Islamic Holy sites in Mecca and Medina, Semnani traveled to Gulbarga and Sarandib in South India.

Meeting with other Sufis 

Semnani is said to have met with various known Sufis of his time that being Mir Sayyid Ali Hamdani, Hafez Shirazi, Bande Nawaz and Sultan Walad the son of the Sufi poet, Rumi

See also
 Ala ud-Daula Simnani
 Alaul Haq Pandavi
 Sufi Saints of South Asia
 Wahab Ashrafi

References

Further reading 

Indian Sufi saints
Chishti Order
People from Ambedkar Nagar district
People from Semnan, Iran
1308 births
1405 deaths
Sufi writers
Sufi poets
Sufi mystics
Sufi teachers
Iranian Sufi saints
Iranian Muslim mystics